James Thomas MA FRCO (born 1963) is an English organist and choirmaster. He has held several liturgical posts at cathedrals, including Blackburn, Chichester and St Edmundsbury Cathedral.

Early life and education
Thomas was born in Banbury, England. He was educated at Magdalen College School, Brackley, before going on to read music at Gonville and Caius College, Cambridge where he was organ scholar. Upon graduating, he spent a year studying for the Postgraduate Certificate in Education. He gained the FRCO diploma in 1985 and was awarded the prize for extemporisation. He spent two years at the Rouen Conservatoire, taught by Louis Thiry, and was awarded a Premier Prix in organ performance in 1988. He was twice a finalist for the Tournemire Prize at the St Albans International Organ Festival in both 1987 and 1988.

Career
Upon returning to England in 1988, Thomas was appointed Assistant Organist of Blackburn Cathedral, a position he held for three years before moving to Chichester Cathedral as Assistant Organist, in 1991. Whilst at Chichester Cathedral, Thomas was also Director of Music of The Prebendal School, the choir school. In September 1997, he left Chichester to become Director of Music at St Edmundsbury Cathedral, a position he held until 2020. During his tenure, the choir made several CDs and broadcasts on the BBC. In 1998, he was appointed conductor of the Cambridgeshire Choral Society, a post he held until 2004. Thomas has given recitals up and down the country, as well as in France and Germany. In 1995, he was a semi-finalist in the Royal College of Organists "Performer of the Year" competition.

Discography
 2009 – The Holy Temple (Regent)
 2004 – So Rich a Crown (Lammas)
 2001 – Godspeed (Lammas)
 2001 – Complete New English Hymnal Vol. 12 (Priory)
 1999 – Advent to Candlemass (Lammas)
 1997 – Sing Ye to the Lord (Lammas)
 1996 – Chichester Commissions (Priory)
 1996 – Great Cathedral Anthems Vol. 7 (Priory)
 199? – Organ Masterworks (Kevin Mayhew)
 1994 – Malcolm Archer: Requiem (Kevin Mayhew)
 1991 – Magnificat and Nunc Dimittis Vol. 2 (Priory)

Works
 We wait for thy loving kindness
 St Edmund Prayer
 The Prayer of St Richard
 Benedicite in E flat-Recently Edited 2012

References

External sources
 Director of Music – profile on St Edmundsbury Cathedral website

English organists
British male organists
1963 births
Living people
Alumni of Gonville and Caius College, Cambridge
Assistant Organists of Chichester Cathedral
People from Banbury
Fellows of the Royal College of Organists
21st-century organists
21st-century British male musicians
Male classical organists